Anna Bożena Włodarczyk (born 24 Mar 1951 in Zielona Góra) is a Polish athlete. She is the 1980 European long jump champion.

Career
Włodarczyk won the long jump at the 1980 European Athletics Indoor Championships and remains the Polish national record holder in the indoor long jump. In the 1980 Olympics, she finished in fourth place after a "home team" Soviet judge changed his mind and allowed Tatyana Kolpakova to get credit for a jump after apparently fouling. She was denied a chance to challenge for a medal in 1984 by the Soviet-led 1984 Summer Olympics boycott. She won five straight Polish National Indoor Long Jump Championships and three times outdoors. Between 1980 and 1984, she was ranked in the worldwide top 10 four times.

Włodarczyk is still an active athlete running in Masters athletics competitions to great success. She has accumulated 17 international veterans championship medals, including 13 gold. She is the world indoor record holder for the triple jump W50 (10.69 in Boston 2003).  She also has held the World Record in the W50 Outdoor Pentathlon since 2002. She was the head cross country and track coach at Chapman University in California from 1993 until 2017.

References

1951 births
Living people
Athletes (track and field) at the 1980 Summer Olympics
Polish female long jumpers
Olympic athletes of Poland
People from Zielona Góra
Sportspeople from Lubusz Voivodeship
World record holders in masters athletics